Esther Blaikie MacKinnon (1885–1934) was a Scottish artist who was known for her paintings and engravings. MacKinnon worked with a variety of media including paint, dry point, etchings, and black and white drawings. Notable were her portraits of Cecil and Evelyn Sharp, which currently are part of The National Portrait Gallery's primary collection. Her work was exhibited at the Royal Scottish Academy, the Royal Glasgow Institute, the Royal Academy, and the Society of Women Artists within her lifetime.

Life
The second child of Lachlan MacKinnon (1855–1948) and Theodora Thompson (1859–1939), Esther MacKinnon was born and educated in Aberdeen. MacKinnon primarily worked out of her studio in Hampstead, London, and during her lifetime her engravings and paintings were exhibited widely. She died unmarried at the age of 49.

Selected works 
 Cecil Sharp, 1921. Chalk. National Portrait Gallery. 
 Cecil Sharp, 1921. Pencil. National Portrait Gallery. 
 Lions in a London Square, n.d. Etching and aquatint on paper. Smithsonian American Art Museum. 
 Malmesbury, 1922. Watercolour and pencil on paper. Smithsonian American Art Museum.
 A Negress, n.d. Oil on canvas. Aberdeen Art Gallery & Museums. 
 Weaver, n.d. Colour Lithograph. Smithsonian American Art Museum.

References

External links
 
 Esther Blaikie MacKinnon collection at the Smithsonian American Art Museum

1885 births
1934 deaths
20th-century British printmakers
20th-century Scottish painters
20th-century Scottish women artists
Artists from Aberdeen
Scottish engravers
Scottish women painters
Women engravers
20th-century engravers